Royal Wanxin International Tower is 267 metre-tall skyscraper and hotel in Heping District, Shenyang, China. Construction started in 2004 and it opened in July 2009. A fire broke out in February 2011 but there were no reported casualties. It is the 3rd tallest building in Shenyang, and was the tallest when it was completed.

References

Commercial buildings completed in 2009
Skyscraper hotels in China
Skyscrapers in Shenyang